Thomas Carter, III (born September 5, 1972) is a former American football cornerback who played in the National Football League from 1993 to 2001.  The 17th overall draft pick in the 1993 NFL Draft, Carter played nine seasons for the Washington Redskins, Chicago Bears, and Cincinnati Bengals. Carter played quarterback at Lakewood High School in St. Petersburg, Florida, and accepted a scholarship to play college football at the University of Notre Dame, where he was a three-year starter at the free safety position.  He currently works for the NFL Players Association. 

Carter has four children: Alex, Madison, Cameron, and Peyton. Cameron died of Type 1 diabetes at age 14 on February 21, 2012. Alex Carter was named Virginia's 2011 Gatorade Player of the Year, and was drafted in the 3rd round of the 2015 NFL Draft by the Detroit Lions after a standout career at Stanford.  Madison is currently a news reporter for WVIR-TV NBC29 in Charlottesville, Virginia.

References

1972 births
Living people
American football cornerbacks
Chicago Bears players
Cincinnati Bengals players
Notre Dame Fighting Irish football players
Washington Redskins players
Players of American football from St. Petersburg, Florida